HMAS Psyche (formerly HMS Psyche) was a  protected cruiser built for the Royal Navy at the end of the 19th century. Initially operating on the North America and West Indies Station, the cruiser was transferred to the Australian Squadron in 1903, and remained there until the Royal Australian Navy (RAN) took over responsibility in 1913. After a stint in New Zealand waters and involvement in the Occupation of German Samoa, Psyche was paid off in 1915.

At the recommendation of the Australian government, the ship was commissioned into the RAN in 1915, and assigned to patrol the coast of Burma, in response to the threat of a German-instigated uprising. Psyche operated in the Bay of Bengal and around Sumatra until 1916, when she was docked at Hong Kong for refit. During this, personnel from the ship were used to commission and man the river gunboat . After the refit's conclusion, Psyche patrolled in Chinese waters, before returning to the Bay of Bengal. Psyche returned to Sydney and was paid off in October 1917, but recommissioned a month later for patrols in Australia's northern waters. She was decommissioned for the final time in early 1918. The ship was sold for use as a timber lighter in 1922, and sank in 1940 at Salamander Bay, New South Wales following a storm.

Design and construction
Psyche was a third-class protected cruiser of the nine-ship Pelorus- or P-class. Propulsion was supplied by inverted three-cylinder triple expansion steam engines, built by Keyham, providing  to two propeller shafts.

The cruiser was armed with eight single QF  guns, eight single QF 3-pounder guns, two 4.7-inch guns, two field guns, three Maxim machine guns, and two  torpedo tubes sited above the waterline. The ship's company initially stood at 220, but this was later reduced to 188; 12 officers, and 176 sailors.

Psyche was laid down for the Royal Navy at HM Devonport Dockyard, Plymouth on 15 November 1897. She was launched on 19 July 1898 by Miss E. Carr, sister of the dockyard's admiral superintendent. The cruiser was completed on 28 April 1899, and was placed in reserve until her commissioning on 2 May 1899.

Operational history
Psyche was commissioned on 2 May 1899 by Captain Francis Raymond Pelly, for service on the North America and West Indies Station. Commander Edmund Moore C. Cooper-Key replaced Pelly in command in June 1901. She was at Bermuda in March 1902, visited Colón, Panama in early May, and Havana in late May 1902; and was in Nicaragua in July 1902, when the government captured revolutionists from an attempted coup. The following month she left Bermuda homeward bound, returning to Devonport on 20 August, to pay off on 5 September when she was placed in the D division of the dockyard reserve.

In December 1903, she was transferred to the Royal Navy's Australian Squadron, where she served until October 1913, when the Australia Station was handed to the control of the fledgling RAN. Psyche was then assigned to New Zealand waters. In 1914, Psyche formed part of the escort for the New Zealand Force which occupied German Samoa (now Samoa). Psyche also escorted troop ships heading from New Zealand to the Middle East. She returned to Sydney in late 1914, and was decommissioned on 22 January 1915.

In May 1915, the Australian government suggested to the Admiralty that Psyche be reactivated and loaned to the RAN as a training ship. Approval was granted on 1 June, but before the ship's 1 July commissioning as HMAS Psyche, the Admiralty instead requested that the Australian Commonwealth Naval Board orchestrate a patrol of the Bay of Bengal, in response to the threat of a German-inspired uprising in India and Burma. From there, the ships sailed to Ragoon, arriving on 10 September with Psyches captain, Commander Henry Feakes, under instructions to establish patrols along the Burmese coast with the two warships, plus three British India Steam Navigation Company vessels. For Psyche, 10- to 12-day patrols along the Burmese coast were the norm, interspersed with crew training duties.

On 17 January 1916, the demobilisation of the Burma Coast Patrol was ordered, as the threat of insurrection in India and Burma had ceased, and German machinations had focused on the Malay Peninsula. Psyche arrived at Penang on 28 January, then sailed three days later for Port Blair. From here, the ship performed patrols of Sumatra. On 12 February, seven stokers refused duty in protest over the poor quality of food being provided to the sailors aboard. All seven were found guilty of disobeying orders, and were punished with prison sentences between 12 and 14 months, plus dismissal from the RAN. The remaining stokers were supplemented by native personnel until 25 April, when replacement RAN personnel arrived. During March, the ship patrolled the Gulf of Siam, and escorted a Russian troop convoy sailing to Europe. During April, further patrols of the Bay of Bengal were made, before Psyche sailed to Hong Kong for inspection and refit. During the period from late 1915 to early 1916, Psyche served as escort to two ships carrying Turkish prisoners of war, was responsible for the transportation of two Chinese spies (one of whom escaped), and helped capture the ringleaders of an Indian soldiers' mutiny in Singapore.

During the refit period, personnel from Psyche were used to commission the river gunboat  on 6 July, and then man her to evacuate European civilians from Canton. The gunboat was halfway up the Pearl River Delta when it was learned that the civilians had been recovered by another vessel, and returned to Hong Kong, where Moorhen decommissioned on 23 July. Also during July, sickness ran through the ship, with 67 personnel sent to the naval hospital ashore, while another 41 were treated aboard: about 60% of the ship's company were unfit for duty during this period. Recurring illnesses had been a problem while the ship operated in tropical climates, and the ship's surgeon recommended the ship be deployed to cooler regions. For one day, the reassignment of flag officers meant that Psyche was Flagship of the China Squadron.

Released from dockyard hands on 14 August, Psyche began patrols along the Chinese coast, with a marked improvement of the health of all aboard. These continued until 14 October, when the cruiser was assigned to Singapore for further patrols of the Bay of Bengal and Sumatra. In March and April 1917, she was assigned to escort duties between Burma and India.

The ship was paid off on 16 October 1917. Psyche was reactivated on 20 November 1917 for service along Australia's north-east coast, but after uneventful patrols, she was decommissioned for the final time on 26 March 1918.

Fate
The ship was sold to the Moreland Metal Company on 21 July 1922, who used her as a timber lighter. Psyche sank in 1940 at Salamander Bay, New South Wales, during a heavy storm, which rolled the ship onto her side. The wreck was used by RAN clearance divers for training between 1950 and 1973, and was later broken up during an underwater demolitions exercise.

A memorial to the ship was unveiled at Roy Wood Reserve on 27 June 2015.

Citations

References

External links

 HMAS Psyche Australian War Memorial webpage
 World War I Naval Combat webpage

Pelorus-class cruisers of the Royal Navy
Ships built in Plymouth, Devon
1898 ships
Pelorus-class cruisers of the Royal Australian Navy
World War I cruisers of Australia
Maritime incidents in 1940